Jolyon Rubinstein (born 22 April 1981) is a British actor, writer, producer and director. He is best known for writing and performing on The Revolution Will Be Televised, a show on BBC Three, alongside Heydon Prowse.

He acted in a popular political viral video in the run up to the 2010 United Kingdom general election with over 200,000 hits on YouTube and Yahoo before polling day.

Early life 
Rubinstein was born in Islington, London, England. He was educated at the independent King Alfred School, London, University of the Arts London, the University of Sussex and the State University of New York at Stony Brook. He graduated from the University of the Arts London with an MA in Performance and from the University of Sussex with a BA in Politics and International Relations.

His grandfather was army officer Richard Rubinstein, who earned the Military Cross and the Croix de Guerre during WWII. Jolyon's grandfather had been born to a Jewish-born father and a mother who had converted to Judaism. He later joined the Church of England when marrying Jolyon's paternal grandmother. His patrilineal Rubinstein ancestors have been born in England since at least Jolyon's great-grandfather. On his mother's side, he has Irish ancestry.

Career 
Rubinstein's first professional acting job was that of the PR in the TV series Nathan Barley. After producing for a number of years, Rubinstein and Heydon Prowse got together to direct and act for a number of films for Don't Panic Online. They both wrote and acted for their BBC Three television show The Revolution Will Be Televised. He also wrote for the Financial Times Business and Yahoo. His first video was 'Fishing for Bankers' for the Don't Panic website where he and Prowse put a £5 note on the pavement and pulled it away with a fishing line when a banker leant over to pick it up. In 2018, he co-created the ITV2 hip hop comedy show Don't Hate the Playaz. In 2020, Rubinstein launched the satire news show Not The News with Jolyon Rubinstein on his YouTube channel and launched the new podcast The New Conspiracist, hosted by himself and journalist James Ball.

Personal life 
Rubinstein has known Heydon Prowse since he was eight years old. They studied together at the University of Sussex. He is a Spurs fan. 

He has four cousins, by the names of Lorenzo, Finnegan, Dashiell, and Hugo Driscoll

Filmography

References

External links

Jolyon Rubinstein on BFI

1981 births
Living people
People educated at King Alfred School, London
Alumni of the University of Sussex
British satirists
British film producers
British film directors
British male film actors
English Jews
English activists
Political activists